Dadu may refer to:

Places
Dadu or Khanbaliq, capital of the Yuan dynasty; in modern Beijing
Dadu, Sirsa, a village in Haryana, India
Dadu District, Sindh, Pakistan
Dadu, Pakistan, a town in Dadu District
Dadu railway station (Pakistan)
Dadu Taluka
Dadu, Taichung, Taiwan
Dadu Plateau
Dadu railway station (Taichung)
Kingdom of Middag, also known as the Kingdom of Dadu

Rivers
Dadu River, a tributary of the Yangtze, in Sichuan province, China
Dadu River (Taiwan), also known as the "Wu River"

People
Dadu Dayal (1544–1603), Indian devotional poet-guru
Dadu Mahendranath Singh (fl. 1951–1957), Indian politician
Sergiu Dadu (born 1981), Moldovan footballer

Other uses
Dadu cricket team, based in Dadu, Pakistan